Sreelekha is an Indian given name. Notable people with the name include:

 Sreelekha Mitra (born 1971), Indian Bengali film and television actress
 Sreelekha Mukherji, Indian Bengali actress
 R. Sreelekha (born 1960), Indian police officer

Indian feminine given names